The Nikon 1 AW1 is a Nikon 1 series high-speed mirrorless interchangeable-lens camera  by Nikon. It was announced on September 19, 2013, together with two waterproof lenses.

It has nearly the same features as the 1 J3, but with a heavier body and GPS added.

Features list 
 Effective Pixels: 14.2 million
 Sensor Size: 13.2mm x 8.8mm
 Image sensor format: CX
 Storage Media: SD, SDHC, SDXC
 15 frames per secondwith AF
 30/60 fps with focus locked on first frame
 ISO Sensitivity: 160-6400
 Audio file format: ACC
 Movie file format: MOV
 Monitor Size: 3.0 in. diagonal
 Monitor Type: TFT-LCD with brightness adjustment
 Battery: EN-EL20 Lithium-ion Battery
 Approx. Dimensions: 4.5 in. (113.5 mm) x 2.9 in. (71.5 mm) x 1.5 in. (37 mm)
 Approx. Weight: 11.1 oz. (313 g)

Reviews and criticism
DPReview.com tested the camera extensively both on land and in the sea and noted that the camera had much better image quality than other "rugged cameras" tested. They also noted, however, that "one must be extremely careful, as just a few grains of sand can end the AW1's life ... and repairing or replacing it won't be cheap."

See also

 Nikon 1 series
 Nikon 1-mount

References

External links
Nikon Coolpix AW120 user manual Nikon

Nikon MILC cameras
AW1
Cameras introduced in 2013